Jadwa Investment is the premier investment management and advisory firm in Saudi Arabia and the wider region. Headquartered in Riyadh with three regional offices, the firm has over SAR 70 billion in client assets under management and advisement. Its clients include government entities, local and international institutional investors, leading family offices, and high net-worth individuals.

Today, Jadwa is Saudi Arabia’s best performing public equity manager, the largest private equity investor, and largest manager of listed REITs

Under the CMA decision published on 21 August 2006, Jadwa was awarded a license to offer all types of investment services including: dealing, managing, custody, arranging and advising.

All investment services offered by Jadwa Investment are supervised by a Shariah Supervisory Board and are fully Shariah-compliant. Operating divisions include Asset Management, Investment Banking, Research, Proprietary Investments and Equity Brokerage.

Ownership
The founding partners include Faisal bin Salman, chairman of the board, Mohammed and Abdullah Ibrahim Al Subeaei Company, the Al Zamil Group, Abdulrahman Saleh Al Rajhi, Mohammed Ibrahim Al Issa, Abdulrahman Al Ruwaita, and Abdullatif Kanoo. Tariq Al Sudairy is the CEO of the company.

References

External links 
 Official website

2005 establishments in Saudi Arabia
Financial services companies of Saudi Arabia
Financial services companies established in 2005
Companies based in Riyadh
Private equity firms of the Middle East